My Wife's Girlfriends (Georgian: ჩემი ცოლის დაქალები) is a Georgian TV series, which airs from 2011.

Synopsis
The series describes the different childhood friends, the carefree Kato, the housewife Nina and the Feminist Tina's life. In the third and the fifth seasons, Natashka and Anka join the TV series.

Characters

Kato Kirvalidze (Nino Gachechiladze) 
Kato Kirvalidze is viewed as an "easy" girl to seduce because of her different adventures. (She was married 3 times and she had a lot of boyfriends). She has a daughter with her ex-husband Kote, a soldier. Her parents are divorced. Her father lives in Russia with his daughter, Lika, and her mother works in the US. She is very gullible (for example : Barbare, her lover Maksime's future wife proposed to her to punish Maksime, but at the end, she was punished). In Season 14 her parents married again.

Nina Gurabanidze (Ana Tkebuchava) 
Nina is a Georgian housewife who has 5 children. Nina is married to Dato. She lives with her family, but she wants to become more independent. She is extremely jealous. Her parents live in Saguramo. She has cancer.

Tina Bregvadze (Maka Dzagania) 
Tina is a passionate feminist and an accomplished woman who puts a particular focus on her career. She always gives advice to her friends (in most of cases to Kato) in hard moments and often is portrayed as a judgmental friend among the three. She lives with her mother, Neliko. She had a lot of relationships, but all have failed. Tina became a secondary character when she went to Budapest to study.

Natashka (Eka Demetradze) 
Natashka is an old friend of Kato, Nina and Tina who lived in Gonio. One day, she decided to move to Tbilisi with her sons. Natashka's ex-husband was violent towards her and has forbidden her a lot of things, but she divorced him. She was also in a relationship with Sandro, who cheated on her. but still contacts Nina. She has not appeared on the show since the 10th season.

Anka Gabrichidze (Tina Makharadze) 
Anka is the new friend of Kato, Nina and Tina. She is Nina's and Keti's neighbour. She has one daughter with her ex-boyfriend, Mishka ("Birjeli", literally meaning "Street guy") called Taso, who is friends with Nina's daughter Taso. She is a cheater. She was in a relationship with Tsotne, a politician, a rapper and others. She comes from an aristocratic family.

Dato Gotsiridze (Levan Kochiashvili) 
Dato is  Nina's Husband. He likes to eat Khinkali And drink Beer. He has six children (three sons and three daughters). He is an architect, and doesn't want Nina to work. Dato is about 38 years old. His wife, Nina has cancer.

Cast
 Levan Kochiashvili - Dato Gotsiridze
 Ana Tkebuchava - Nina Gurabanidze
 Salome Sharvadze - Keti 
 Giorgi BakhutaShvili - Cotne Cotashvili
 Bakhva Bregvadze - Bakhva
 Nino Kasradze - Maka Anjafaridze
 Vika Kalandia - Tika
 Giorgi Barbakadze - Jeko Gotsiridze
 Keta Orbeladze - Taso Gotsiridze
 [Marie Karkashadze] - Elene Managadze
 Nino Gachechildze - Kato Kirvalidze      * Maka Dzagania - Tina Bregvadze              * Baia Dvalishvili-Neliko      * Merab Ninidze -              * Nanuka Gulua - Dochi Alishbaia            * Ana Chiradze - Chika Medzmariashvili

See also
 Television in Georgia

References

External links
  My Wife's Girlfriends official website
 

Georgia (country) television series
2010s Georgia (country) television series
Rustavi 2 original programming